Daniel J. Clancy (New Orleans, 11 January 1964) is an American technologist and computer scientist. After working at NASA, he was the engineering director for Google Book Search from 2005 to early 2014. From 2014 to 2018 was Vice President of product and engineering at social networking service Nextdoor. 

He became President of Twitch Interactive, the parent company of Twitch in 2019. In March 2023, Clancy became CEO of Twitch, after previous CEO Emmett Shear announced he would step down.

Life and work 
Clancy received a BA in computer science and theatre from Duke University in 1985. He has a PhD in artificial intelligence from the University of Texas at Austin. While in school, Clancy worked at Trilogy, Xerox Webster Research center and NASA's Jet Propulsion Laboratory.

NASA 
Clancy worked in different positions at NASA, first as a researcher on Integrated Health Management, autonomy, and robotics in 1998. In 2000 Clancy became chief of the Computational Sciences Division at NASA Ames Research Center. Since 2003 he served as director of the Exploration Technologies Directorate, also at Ames. The directorate supports over 700 people researching both robotic and human exploration missions. It is responsible for areas including intelligent systems, nanotechnology, entry systems and others. At NASA, Clancy participated in the team that developed the agency's plan to return men to the Moon and eventually Mars. Clancy was also head of information sciences and technology at NASA, leading teams related to artificial intelligence.

Google 
In 2005, Clancy left NASA for Google, where he worked on International Search Quality, before becoming Engineering Lead for Google Book Search. There he worked on scaling the core technology that allowed Google to scan millions of books each year, as well as optimizing search rank results. While working with Google, Clancy took an active role in negotiating the Google Book Search copyright lawsuit settlement, and has been a spokesperson for Google in public statements about the settlement.

In 2008 he became Engineering Lead at Google Search Properties along with Jen Fitzpatrick, with responsibility for all of Googles search products, like Image Search, Product Search, Google News, Book Search, Google Finance or Google Video, with a continued focus on Book Search as well as Google News.

From 2010 to 2012, Clancy oversaw the Engineering and Product Lead divisions at YouTube, again focusing on search as well as infrastructure. He then became Senior Director for Research at Google, leading a variety of research teams including Sibyl, Googles massively parallel machine learning program, Human Computer Interaction, personalization and recommendations, and the Course Builder team & EdX partnership.

Nextdoor 
In 2014, Clancy joined social media site Nextdoor as Vice President of product and engineering. As part of the executive team, he was responsible for leading the product, engineering and data science teams. He was Nextdoors first executive hire outside of its founding team. Clancy left Nextdoor in 2018.

Twitch 
In 2019, Clancy joined Twitch, initially as Vice President of creator and community experience, reporting to CEO Emmett Shear. He later became President of the Amazon-owned parent company of Twitch, Twitch Interactive, while also leading the product, engineering and go-to market functions.

On September 21 2022, in a 3AM blog post, Clancy announced that Twitch would lower the subscription split partnered streamers receive to 50/50, from the previous 70/30, reportedly to ensure Twitch would not operate at a loss. On the same day, Bloomberg reported that Twitch's Vice President of global creators, Constance Knight, would be leaving the company. The company's chief content officer Mike Aragon and chief operating officer Sara Clemens had also left earlier the same year. The change was criticized by streamers, as well as the head of competitor Youtube Gaming, Ryan Wyatt, saying "the creator should be getting a disproportionate amount—this shouldn’t even be up for debate". Youtube Gaming offers a 70/30 split, while platforms like OnlyFans or Patreon take 20% or less. Twitch streamer PointCrow wrote "The fact Twitch's solution to monetary problems is to cut creator pay rather than facilitate a better platform so more viewers visit the live-streaming site is incredibly worrying". 

On March 16, 2023, Clancy became CEO of Twitch, after previous CEO and Justin.tv co-founder Emmett Shear announced he would step down after 16 years at the company. Both Shear and Clancy have been described as "more product-focused than creator-focused". On March 20, Clancy announced that Twitch would be laying off 400 employees, as part of Amazon-wide layoffs affecting 9000 workers across the company.

References

External links 
 danclancy.me personal website
 
 
 
 
 A post summarizing one of Clancy's presentations about the Google Book Search settlement and proposed Rights Registry
 Summary of an ALA 2009 panel on the settlement

Living people
University of Texas at Austin alumni
Duke University alumni
1964 births
Amazon (company) people
Twitch (service) people
Businesspeople in information technology